, or "Clouds Above the Hill" is a Japanese historical novel by Shiba Ryōtarō originally published serially from 1968 to 1972 in eight volumes.  A three-year NHK television special drama series based on the novel and also entitled Saka no Ue no Kumo was shown in thirteen episodes from 2009 to 2011.

The novel is set in the Meiji period and focuses on three characters from the city of Matsuyama: Akiyama Yoshifuru, his brother Akiyama Saneyuki, and their friend, Masaoka Tsunenori, better known as Masaoka Shiki.  The novel follows their lives from childhood through the First Sino-Japanese War, culminating in the Russo-Japanese War of 1904–05.

The city of Matsuyama has a Saka no Ue no Kumo Museum dedicated to the novel and associated TV series.

English translation
An English translation of  Saka no Ue no kumo  was published in stages by Routledge as  Clouds Above the Hill  in four volumes. Vol. 1 describes the growth of Japan’s fledgling Meiji state and introduces the main protagonists. Vol. 2 describes the early stages of the Russo-Japanese war up to the battle of Liaoyang, where Japan seals a victory which shocks the world. The first halves of both volumes were translated by Paul McCarthy and the latter halves by Juliet Winters Carpenter. Vol. 3 contains the middle stages of the war and was translated by Carpenter. Vol. 4 contains the battle at Mukden and the naval showdown in the Tsushima strait, resulting in the destruction of the Russia’s Baltic Fleet and the triumphant return to Yokohama of the Japanese fleet. Vol. 4 was translated by Andrew Cobbing.
A set containing all four volumes was released in 2014.

References

Novels by Ryōtarō Shiba
Historical novels
Novels first published in serial form
Japanese serial novels
Novels set in the Meiji period
Works originally published in Japanese newspapers